The Brill Octagon House is a historic octagon house at Capon Springs and McIlwee Roads in Capon Springs, West Virginia.  It is a two-story wood-frame structure, that is actually cruciform in shape, but is given an octagonal appearance by the presence of two-story triangular porches that join the corners of the cross.  The house was built about 1890 by one of a father-son pair, both named Elias Brill.  The elder Brill, a more likely candidate as its builder, was a farm laborer, and was according to family lore guided in the building's design by an architect who was a summer guest at the Capon Springs Resort.  The design is apparently a throwback to the briefly popular octagon house movement led by Orson Squire Fowler in the 1850s.

The house was listed on the National Register of Historic Places in 2016.

See also

List of octagon houses
List of historic sites in Hampshire County, West Virginia
National Register of Historic Places listings in Hampshire County, West Virginia

References

Houses completed in 1890
Houses in Hampshire County, West Virginia
Houses on the National Register of Historic Places in West Virginia
National Register of Historic Places in Hampshire County, West Virginia
1890 establishments in West Virginia
Octagon houses in the United States
Wooden houses in the United States